The inverted bell is a metaphorical name for a geometric shape that resembles a bell upside-down.

By context
In architecture, the term is applied to describe the shape of the capitals of Corinthian columns.

The inverted bell is used in shape classification in pottery, often featured in archaeology as well as in modern times.

In statistics, a bimodial distribution is sometimes called an inverted bell curve.

References

Geometric shapes